The 1898 North-West Territories general election took place on 4 November 1898. This was the fourth general election in the history of the North-West Territories, Canada. It was held to elect members of the Legislative Assembly of the North-West Territories.

Frederick W. A. G. Haultain was still the first premier of the North-West Territories (NWT). That title was given by legislation passed in 1897. He was the last premier of the NWT until 1980.

There were three big issues in this election, the first being acquiring provincial rights and how to divide the NWT into provinces.

The second issue was the transfer of education from the federal to the territorial level. This was Haultain's personal project. Unfortunately for the NWT, that power was not turned over until 1970.

The third issue was the territory's deficit budget. The territory was facing pressure from a rapidly increasing population in all parts of the territory. Earlier in 1898 the territorial government tried to exert control over liquor revenue in the Klondike, since it was footing the bill for increased services and policing. The federal government however interfered and dealt a huge blow, when it carved the Yukon Territory out of the NWT and appointed a council loyal to the federal government to gain control.

This was the first general election in which the election was contested along party lines in the NWT. Frederick W. A. G. Haultain sustained the governing North-West Territories Liberal-Conservative Party in coalition with James Hamilton Ross, who was a member of the Hautain cabinet but a Liberal member. Robert Brett remained leader of the official opposition.

Political parties were still controversial in this election as noted in the Calgary Herald editorial from 17 November 1898 Weekly edition, that debated the pros and cons of the bringing the "Dominion party lines" to the territorial legislature.

Election results

Members of the Legislative Assembly elected
For complete electoral history, see individual districts

 Brett (Banff) was elected in a contentiously close election, so close that a by-election had to be held, which Arthur Sifton won.

See also
List of Northwest Territories general elections

External links
Haultain Ross government sustained Medicine Hat News 10 November 1898
4th General Election Macleod Gazette 4 November 1898
Personnel of the Territorial Assembly 1888–1905

1898
1898 elections in Canada
1898 in the Northwest Territories
November 1898 events